Hebei Subdistrict is a subdistrict in Jiaohe, Jilin province, China. , it has six residential communities and two villages under its administration:
Yongxiang Community
Yongtai Community
Yongkang Community
Yonglong Community
Fenglinwan Community
Yongsheng Community
Tuanjie Village
Xinli Village

See also 
 List of township-level divisions of Jilin

References 

Township-level divisions of Jilin
Jiaohe, Jilin